These Are My Sins is the first full-length album by I, The Breather. The album was released on December 7, 2010 through Sumerian Records.

Track listing

Band members
I, The Breather
 Shawn Spann – lead vocals
 Jered Youngbar – guitar
 Justin Huffman – guitar
 Armand Jasari – bass
 Morgan Wright – drums

References 

2010 debut albums
Sumerian Records albums
I, the Breather albums